Kaufer is a surname. Notable people with the surname include:

Aaron Kaufer, American politician
Caroline Kaufer, American philanthropist
David S. Kaufer, American scholar
Evelin Kaufer, East German sprinter
Jonathan Kaufer, American film director
Virág Kaufer, Hungarian politician
 Stephen Kaufer, American entrepreneur

See also
216624 Kaufer, a minor planet

Occupational surnames